WebLogic was a company (from 1995 to 1998) credited with creating the first J2EE application server, the WebLogic Application Server.

History 
Paul Ambrose, Bob Pasker, Laurie Pitman, and Carl Resnikoff founded Weblogic, Inc. in September 1995. The founders worked together to pursue what eventually became the "Application Server". In 1998, WebLogic appointed Ali Kutay as President and CEO. Weblogic was funded by Regis McKenna and Frank J. Caufield.

BEA Systems acquired WebLogic, Inc. in 1998.

Oracle Corporation acquired BEA Systems in 2008.

See also 
 Oracle WebLogic Server

External links
 Weblogic page from Oracle Corp
 
 WebLogicalia

WebLogic
Java enterprise platform
WebLogic
1998 mergers and acquisitions